The 2010 election of members to the Senate of the Philippines was the 30th election to the Senate of the Philippines. It was held on Monday, May 10, 2010, to elect 12 of the 24 seats in the Senate. Together with those elected in 2007, they will comprise the 15th Congress. The senators elected in 2007 will serve until June 30, 2013, while the senators elected in this election will serve up to June 30, 2016. The 2010 presidential election, elections to the House of Representatives as well as local elections occurred on the same date. The Philippines uses plurality-at-large voting for seats in the Senate: the twelve candidates with the highest number of votes wins the twelve seats up for election.

In the election, ten senators that had previously served in the Senate, six of them incumbents, were re-elected. The two neophytes, Bongbong Marcos and TG Guingona, had their fathers previously serve in the Senate. The first nine candidates that were leading in the canvassing of votes by the Commission on Elections were proclaimed winners on May 15, while the last three were proclaimed on May 18.

After the election, no party won a majority of seats, although the Liberal Party had the most seats with five, although with the election of Benigno Aquino III as president, the Liberals will have 4 members in the Senate. The independents have five, while the Nacionalista Party and Lakas–CMD have four each. It is expected that Manuel Villar of the Nacionalistas and Francis Pangilinan from the Liberals be the top contenders to be Senate President; incumbent Juan Ponce Enrile (PMP) originally said he would not seek the office, but with the inability of either of the frontrunners to garner the required thirteen votes, he has presented himself as a compromise candidate to avoid deadlock.

On the convening of the 15th Congress on July 25, Enrile was successfully reelected as Senate President by 17 senators, with 3 senators voting for his opponent, Alan Peter Cayetano of the Nacionalistas. Three more senators did not attend, and one seat was vacated by Benigno Aquino III who was elected President.

Retiring and term-limited incumbents
Three senators are voluntarily retiring from the Senate at the end of their current term (two ran for president, and another for vice president; all lost), while two other senators are term-limited by the Constitution of the Philippines after serving two consecutive terms.

Rodolfo Biazon (Liberal)
Term-limited in 2010, ran for House representative from Muntinlupa's at-large district and won.
Dick Gordon (Bagumbayan-VNP)
Ran for President and lost. Ran for senator in 2013 and lost; ran again in 2016 and won
Jamby Madrigal (Independent)
Ran for President and lost. Ran for senator in 2013 and lost.
Aquilino Pimentel Jr. (PDP–Laban)
Term-limited in 2010. Pimentel subsequently retired from politics.
Mar Roxas (Liberal)
Ran for Vice-president and lost. Ran for president in 2016 and lost; ran for senator in 2019 and still lost.

Campaign
The candidates had varied campaign strategies, but the candidates from the Liberal Party and the Nacionalista Party relied on TV advertisements for exposure. Celebrities also endorsed candidates, notably Kris Aquino for Tito Sotto and Sharon Cuneta for Neric Acosta. As a callback to the successful "VOT FOR D CHAMMP" campaign slogan of the People Power Coalition during the 2001 election, the Liberals used the "SLAMAT LORRRD" acronym to easily convey their senatorial line-up.

On April 18, ABS-CBN held the Harapan (Face-Off) senatorial debates at La Consolacion College – Manila. Adel Tamano scored the highest rating amongst the candidates who participated, followed by Neric Acosta and Risa Hontiveros-Baraquel, while Francisco Tatad rated poorly.

Actors Bong Revilla (born Ramon Revilla Jr.), who changed his legal name to his screen name "Bong Revilla" prior to the campaign period, and Jinggoy Estrada, together with Miriam Defensor Santiago consistently topped the poll surveys from Social Weather Stations and Pulse Asia. On the other hand, while all incumbent senators who are running appeared safe to retain their seats, it appeared that no party will win a majority of the 12 seats being contested.

Candidates
On December 15, 2009, the Commission on Elections (COMELEC) released the approved list of candidates for the Senate elections. On January 14, 2010, the COMELEC approved four more candidates for the Senate, reaching a total of 61.

These are the candidates that were listed on the ballot, with order determined by surname. The tickets are as advertised by the coalition; these are unrecognized by the COMELEC but is extensively used by the media. The COMELEC does list the political parties of the candidates on the ballot. One has twelve votes for senator, with one vote for every candidate. A voter can distribute one's vote to any ticket as one seems fit. One can vote less than the twelve candidates from any ticket (open list), although the coalitions encourage voters to vote "12–0" (if applicable). A voter who had voted for more than twelve candidates will have his ballot spoiled, invalidating the rest of that voter's votes in the senate election.

A candidate may be included in more than one ticket; a party, if it has not enough candidates to complete a 12-candidate ticket, can invite guest candidates from other parties. These guest candidates can choose to acknowledge their inclusion in other tickets and are not bound to follow the policies of the tickets that adopted them.

Opinion polls

Note: Tables only include confirmed candidates by the COMELEC.
The following are results of surveys taken after candidates were confirmed by the COMELEC.

Results
Incumbents, former senators, and candidates whose other family members that had Senate experience performed well. All six incumbents who ran held their seats, four former senators also won, and the two neophyte senators, Bongbong Marcos and TG Guingona had their fathers (Ferdinand Marcos and Teofisto Guingona Jr., respectively) previously served at the Senate.

Among the six winning incumbents, three had family members that previously served in the Senate: Bong Revilla (son of Ramon Revilla Sr.), Jinggoy Estrada (son of Joseph Estrada) and Pia Cayetano (daughter of Rene Cayetano; her brother, Alan Peter Cayetano, won in 2007). The other winning incumbents are Miriam Defensor Santiago, Lito Lapid, and Senate president Juan Ponce Enrile.

The three of the four former winning senators also had a family member with Senate experience: Ralph Recto (grandson of Claro M. Recto), Tito Sotto (grandson of Vicente Sotto) and Sergio Osmeña III (grandson of Sergio Osmeña and son of Sergio Osmeña Jr.). The other returning senator is Franklin Drilon.

Only one former senator ran and lost: Francisco Tatad; candidates with no prior Senate experience but had family members that previously served in the Senate but lost are Ruffy Biazon (son of outgoing Senator Rodolfo Biazon), Sonia Roco (wife of Raul Roco), Adel Tamano (son of Mamintal Tamano) and Susan Ople (daughter of Blas Ople).

The election of Benigno Aquino III as President of the Philippines in concurrent elections means that his Senate seat will be vacant until June 30, 2013.

Key:
 ‡ Seats up
 + Gained by a party from another party
 √ Held by the incumbent
 * Held by the same party with a new senator
^ Vacancy

Per candidate

Per coalition

Per party
With the election of Benigno Aquino III as president, there were only 23 seats in the Senate's chamber for the 15th Congress of the Philippines. There were calls to let the 13th placed candidate, Risa Hontiveros-Baraquel, to be proclaimed in lieu of Aquino leaving the Senate but neither her campaign nor the Liberal Party petitioned the commission on the matter. Aquino's vacated seat won't be contested in a special election as special elections for Senate vacancies can only be scheduled on the next scheduled election; that seat would be up for the 2013 election.

Unofficial results
Several organizations released unofficial tallies when the commission's first preliminary tally was yet to be released.

Seats won per party

Tally

Aftermath
With the lineup for the 15th Congress becoming apparent, senator-elect Miriam Defensor-Santiago (PRP) commented that her ally Manuel Villar has the numbers to retake the Senate Presidency. Villar resigned from the senate presidency just prior to the election period and Juan Ponce Enrile (PMP) became the new senate president. Jockeying for the position then began with Francis Pangilinan (Liberal) announcing his intention to be senate president, citing the need for a "friendly" Senate for the Benigno Aquino III administration. The Liberals still have to agree on a candidate, as Ponce Enrile earlier said that he will not seek the post.

The Liberals apparently narrowed down their candidates to former Senate President Franklin Drilon and Pangilinan, with Villar as the Nacionalista bloc's candidate. Independent senator Francis Escudero remarked that some senators are conducting exploratory talks on who they will field for the post of Senate President.

In July 2010, the Liberal Party announced that Pangilinan will be the candidate for the Senate presidency. Pangilinan will lead in seeking alliances with other senators and said that he will not seek an alliance with the Nacionalista Party.

Perceived voting blocs in the Senate:

On July 23, previous Senate President Enrile announced that he was approached by Drilon, Recto (both Liberals) and Escudero (independent) on July 20 informing him that they will support him once he agrees to be included in the race. Enrile agreed, with the conditions that he will not actively campaign, nor enter with a "bargaining effort with anyone." Sotto (NPC) remarked that retaining Enrile emerged as a viable compromise to prevent an impasse on the opening of Congress.

Recognizing that he can't secure the required 13 votes to win the Senate Presidency, Pangilinan has withdrawn his bid on July 25. The Liberals will now support Enrile for the Senate Presidency.

Election for Senate President
With Loren Legarda nominating Enrile, he won the Senate Presidency with a vote of 17–3, defeated Alan Peter Cayetano, who was nominated by Joker Arroyo with 4 absent senators: Cayetano became the Minority Floor Leader instead.

References

External links
Official website of the Commission on Elections
 Official website of National Movement for Free Elections (NAMFREL)
Official website of the Parish Pastoral Council for Responsible Voting (PPCRV)

Results
Philippines 2010 Election Results – Main Site
Philippines 2010 Election Results – Alternate Site
PPCRV Map Viewer – PPCRV Encoded Site
PPCRV Map Viewer – PPCRV Site
NAMFREL – 2010 PARALLEL COUNT – NAMFREL Site
HALALAN 2010: Latest Comelec official results – ABS-CBN Site
ELEKSYON 2010: National Election Results Tally – GMA Site
ELEKSYON 2010: Regional Election Results Tally – GMA Site
Auto-Vote 2010: Senatorial Election Results – Hatol ng Bayan Site
The Vote 2010 Election Results Tally – Bombo Radyo Site

Media websites
Halalan 2010 – Election coverage by ABS-CBN
Eleksyon 2010 – Election coverage by GMA Network
Hatol ng Bayan (Auto-Vote 2010) – Election coverage by NBN-4, RPN-9 and IBC-13

2010 Philippine general election
2010